Maní is a small city in Maní Municipality in the central region of the Yucatán Peninsula, in the Mexican state of Yucatán. It is about 100 km to the south south-east of Mérida, Yucatán, some 16 km east of Ticul. The village of Tipikal lies 6 km to the east.

The population is currently around 4000, similar now to the estimated 4500 in the 16th century.

History
Maní's four millennium existence historically involves mostly its early Maya period, followed in recent centuries by its Spanish conquistador and religious period. Its Mexican period beginning over a century ago involved conflict.

Early history
Maní has been continuously occupied for approximately 4000 years. In the postclassic Mesoamerican era it was home to the Tutul-Xiu Maya dynasty, which moved their capital here from Uxmal in the 13th century. The Xiu were the dominant power in the western Yucatán after the fall of Mayapan in 1441. Maní served as the main religious center in honor of the deity Kukulcan (Cukulcan, Topiltzin Quetzalcoatl) for the Maya with an annual chic kaban festival until 1341.

With the arrival of the Spanish the Xiu of Maní allied themselves with the Spanish and assisted in the conquest of the rest of the peninsula.

Maya book burning
On 12 July 1562, Friar Diego de Landa, who held the office of inquisitor before the Monastery of San Miguel Arcángel, held an auto de fe Inquisitional ceremony in Maní, burning a number of Maya hieroglyphic books and a reported 5000 idols, saying that they were "works of the devil". The number of books burned is disputed. Landa claimed only burning 27. This act and numerous incidents of torture at the monastery were used to speed the mass adoption of Roman Catholicism throughout the region.

Landa's burning of these sacred books with Mayan writing and the subsequent reaction were described by him as follows:

Guerra de Castas
Maní was involved in part of the multi-decade conflict in the Guerra de Castas, the Caste War of the Yucatán. An engraved stone narrates an episode of the event for Maní in 1850.

Church and Convent of San Miguel

The town has an old Franciscan monastery established in  1549, the Parroquia y Exconvento de San Miguel Arcangel. The large building was built using cut stones from many of the Pre-Columbian structures of Maní. A large open chapel is on the north side with the two bell gables on the church facade. Inside, the apse vault has some early colonial era fresco murals. The nave interior houses three Baroque carved altars with statues of saints and images. Restoration work on the monastery building and its artwork began in 2001.

Surroundings
The area around Maní is largely devoted to agriculture, principally henequen, maiz, cattle, and fruit. Hammocks are made in the city.

Festivals
Each 15 to 24 August Maní holds a festival in honor of the Virgin of the Assumption. Each 3 January is a festival of the Virgin of Candlemas.

Photo gallery

See also
List of destroyed libraries
Cultural genocide
Cristóbal de Oñate
Juan de Oñate

Notes

Citations

References
English
Bancroft, Hubert Howe (1883), The Native Races of the Pacific States, Vol. II: Civilized Nations, Bancroft & Co., San Francisco, 1883 edition.
.
Clendinnen, Inga (2010), "Disciplining the Indians: Franciscan Ideology and Missionary Violence in Sixteenth Century Yucatán" (essay; chapter 3), The Cost of Courage in Aztec Society: Essays on Mesoamerican Society and Culture, Cambridge University Press,  (hardback).
Lougheed, Vivien (2009), Travel Adventures: Yucatan – Chetumal, Merida & Campeche, "Chapter 4.10.2.9: Mani", Hunter Travel (guides), Hunter Publishing, Inc., Edison, New Jersey.
Nicholson, H.B. (2001), Topiltzin Quetzalcoatl: The Once and Future Lord of the Toltecs, University Press of Colorado; Boulder, Colorado.
Nimoy, Leonard (narrator) (1978), In Search of... (TV series), Episode 28 (Series 2, Episode 4; airdate 1978 January 7), "Mayan Mysteries", Alan Landsburg Productions, copyright 1977.
Sharer, Robert J. (1994), The Ancient Maya, 5th edition.

Spanish
Solís, Juan F. Molina (1896); Historia Antigua de Yucatán, La ruina de Uxmal y la fundación de Maní. Supplemento (1896), Biblioteca Virtual de Yucatan.

External links

 Maní on Mayanroutes.com
 Ghosts of Mani on YucatanLiving.com
 Municipal information on gob.mx in Spanish language

Maya sites in Yucatán
Populated places in Yucatán
Ancient libraries
Maya sites that survived the end of the Classic Period